The 1902 Tie Cup Final was the final match to decide the winner of the Tie Cup, the 3rd. edition of the international competition organised by the Argentine and Uruguayan Associations together. The final was contested by the two same teams of the previous edition, Argentine sides Alumni and Rosario A.C., from Buenos Aires and Rosario respectively. 

The winner was decided after a third match, where Rosario took revenge from the previous final and beat Alumni 2–1 in extra time after the match and the playoff ended 1–1 in both cases. All the matches were played at Sociedad Sportiva Argentina in Palermo, Buenos Aires. Rosario won its first Tie Cup after being finalist in the two previous editions.

Qualified teams

Overview 
For this edition, the number of participating teams increased to 11, 6 from Argentina and 5 from Uruguay. Playing in a single-elimination tournament, Rosario entered directly to the semifinal, where the squad beat Belgrano 2–0 at Plaza Jewell. On the other hand, Alumni defeated Barracas 2–0 at Quilmes A.C., Lomas (2-0 also in Quilmes), qualifying for the semifinal where the team beat Uruguayan CURCC at Paso del Molino.

The final was held in Sociedad Sportiva Argentina in Palermo, Buenos Aires on August 24, 1902. For the first time, tickets were charged, with all money collected went to charity. The match ended 1–1 and an extra time was added, with no modifications on the score. The game continued with an additional extra time of 20 minutes, but the match ended with no new goals. As a result, a playoff was scheduled for September 14 at the same venue. A new 1–1 draw (with three extra times of 30, 20 and 7 minutes) paved the road for a second playoff on September 28, also at La Sportiva. In that match, J. Moore scored but his goal was annulled. With a persistent attack by the Alumni players, Dillon scored after goalkeeper Boardman failed to stop a shot from Leonard. Nevertheless, in the play that followed the Alumni goal, Rosario A.C. forced the draw after J. Parr pushed the ball to the goal.

As the third match ended tied, an extra time of 30 minutes was played with no goals scored. After that, it was decided that the match would continued until one of the teams scored, ("golden goal" rule). It happened when J. Parr scored after a pass by Alfredo Le Bas. That goal crowned Rosario as new champion, finally beating Alumni 2–1 and winning its first Tie Cup trophy. J. Parr was proclaimed as the most valuable player.

Match details

Final

Playoff

2nd. Playoff

References

t
t
1902 in Argentine football
Football in Buenos Aires